Hollywood Man (released in the UK as Death Threat) is a 1976 American film directed by Jack Starrett. The film was featured in the 1997 Quentin Tarantino Film Festival.

Plot
Cash-strapped actor/director Rafe Stoker (Smith) reluctantly agrees to put up almost all of his personal fortune as collateral to shady investors to complete production on his action film. In turn, they hire Harvey (Girardin), an unstable biker, to sabotage the production so that they can collect on Stoker's pledge. Harvey and his gang engage in escalating acts of violence against Stoker's film crew and other random people, while Stoker desperately attempts to complete his film shoot amid other production delays. After completing the movie, Stoker and his girlfriend Julie (Woronov) are gunned down by thugs hired by his backers.

Cast
William Smith as Rafe Stoker
Ray Girardin as Harvey
Jude Farese as Rhodes
Jennifer Billingsley as Buttons
Mary Woronov as Julie (as "Mary Waronov")
Michael Delano as J.J.
Tom Simcox as The Sheriff
Don Stroud as Barney
Carmine Caridi as Anthony
Angelo Farese as Angelo
John Alderman as Jesus
Wayde Preston as Tex
David Pritchard as Dennis
Stefanie Auerbach as Audrey
Art Hern as The Hollywood Producer
Byron Mabe as John
Clay Tanner as Dave
Shelly Babcock as The Nurse
Michelle Marley as The Lady in the Hospital
Eddie Duncan as The Boy in the Hospital
Stafford Morgan as Bill
Billy Rose as The Bartender
Peter Mengrone as Hit Man
Don Sebastian as Hit Man
Beau Gibson as The Hollywood Stuntman
Bud Davis as The Hollywood Stuntman
Charles Pitts as Newlywed
Reggi Lynn as Newlywed
Don Banashek as Boy in the Van
Cheryl Dunn as Waitress
John De Troia as The Stillman
Gary Littlejohn as Biker

Soundtrack
Tony Chance - "Hollywood Man" (Music and Lyrics by Arnold Capitanelli)

References

External links

1976 films
1970s action drama films
1970s English-language films
1970s Spanish-language films
1976 drama films
1976 multilingual films
American multilingual films
Films directed by Jack Starrett